Chen Fei may refer to:

 Chen Fei (politician) (born 1975), Chinese politician
 Chen Fei (artist) (born 1983), Chinese artist
 Chen Fei (judoka) (born 1990), Chinese judoka

See also
Consort Chen (disambiguation)